Tengah is an Indonesian and Malay word meaning "Central". It can be found in topography, e.g.

Kalimantan Tengah
Tengah Islands or Central Archipelago.
Tengah, Singapore
Tengah Air Base

 
Indonesian words and phrases
Malay words and phrases